Elinor Carbone is a Connecticut politician who is currently serving as mayor of Torrington, a city in Litchfield County. She is serving her second term. She was first elected in November 2013, and was re-elected in November 2017. Carbone previously served on both the Board of Education and the Torrington City Council.

Early life
Carbone was born in Torrington. She attended Torrington High School, where she met her husband Gerard. She obtained an associate degree in medical assisting from Naugatuck Valley Community College. Prior to being elected mayor, Carbone worked as a probate paralegal in Litchfield.

Career
Carbone served on both the Torrington City Council and the Torrington Board of Education. Carbone also served as a member of the Torrington Development Corp. from 2006-2012, the Charter Revision Commission from 2011-2012, the Blue Ribbon Commission from 2009–12 and as a liaison to the Mayor's Committee on Youth from 2007-13.

Carbone was first elected mayor in 2013, having received the endorsement of the incumbent mayor Ryan Bingham, and former mayor Delia R. Donne. In 2014, she was a panelist at the Northeast Connecticut WOW! Forum, alongside Gayle King.

She was subsequently re-elected in 2017, strongly defeating her only challenger, the Reverend Peter Aduba.  During her second term, she updated the town's housing anti-discrimination policy to be compliant with the 1964 Civil Rights Act.

Carbone is a member of the Republican Party.

Electoral history

}

References

Living people
1957 births
Connecticut Republicans
People from Torrington, Connecticut
Connecticut city council members
Mayors of places in Connecticut
Women mayors of places in Connecticut
Women city councillors in Connecticut
21st-century American women